Norway competed at the 1928 Summer Olympics in Amsterdam, Netherlands. 52 competitors, all men, took part in 42 events in 9 sports.

Medalists

Athletics

Boxing

Men's Flyweight (– 50.8 kg)
 Olav Nielsen
 First Round — Bye
 Second Round — Lost to Baddie Lebanon (RSA), points

Men's Heavyweight (+ 79.4 kg)
 Sverre Sørsdal 
 First Round — Bye
 Quarterfinals — Defeated Alexander Kaletchetz (USA), KO-1 
 Semifinals — Lost to Nils Ramm (SWE), points
 Third Place Match — Lost to Michael Michaelsen (DEN), walk-over

Cycling

Four cyclists, all men, represented Norway in 1928.

Individual road race
 Gustav Kristiansen
 Karl Hansen
 Ragnvald Martinsen
 Reidar Raaen

Equestrian

Six equestrians, all men, and seven horses represented Norway in 1928.

Individual dressage
 Paul Michelet on Benue

Individual eventing
 Bjart Ording on And Over
 Arthur Qvist on Hidalgo
 Eugen Johansen on Baby

Team eventing
 Bjart Ording on And Over, Arthur Qvist on Hidalgo, Eugen Johansen on Baby

Individual jumping
 Knut Gysler on Sans Peur
 Anton Klaveness on Barrabas
 Bjart Ording on Fram I

Team jumping
 Knut Gysler on Sans Peur, Anton Klaveness on Barrabas, Bjart Ording on Fram I

Fencing

Five fencers, all men, represented Norway in 1928.

Men's foil
 Johan Falkenberg
 Frithjof Lorentzen
 Jacob Bergsland

Men's team foil
 Jacob Bergsland, Johan Falkenberg, Frithjof Lorentzen, Sigurd Akre-Aas

Men's épée
 Raoul Heide
 Sigurd Akre-Aas
 Frithjof Lorentzen

Men's team épée
 Sigurd Akre-Aas, Raoul Heide, Frithjof Lorentzen, Jacob Bergsland

Men's sabre
 Sigurd Akre-Aas

Sailing

Nine sailors, all men, represented Norway in 1928. 

12' Dinghy
 Henrik Robert

6 Metre
 Johan Anker, Erik Anker, Håkon Bryhn, Crown Prince Olav

8 Metre
 Bernhard Lund, Magnus Konow, Jens Salvesen, Wilhelm Wilhelmsen, Halfdan Hansen (Reserve, did not actually compete)

Swimming

Wrestling

Art competitions

References

External links
Official Olympic Reports
International Olympic Committee results database

Nations at the 1928 Summer Olympics
1928
1928 in Norwegian sport